Nawaloka Hospital traded as Nawaloka Hospitals PLC, was established in 1985 by Deshamanya H. K. Dharmadasa. Nawaloka Hospital is one of Sri Lanka's largest private hospitals and has created a chain of hospitals across the country. It was founded by H.K. Dharmadasa in 1985. It is also the first hospital in Sri Lanka to introduce Intensive Care Units, Coronary Care Units, Laparoscopic Surgery and Thoracic Surgery.

History 
It was founded by business magnate H.K. Dharmadasa (aka Nawaloka Mudalai) in 1985 as the first corporate private hospital in Sri Lanka. Nawaloka Hospital Group was listed on the Colombo Stock Exchange in 2004. The hospital has more than 400 beds and 1,000 staff members. In 2011 Nawaloka was awarded ISO 9001:2008 Certification. In 1987 introduced first CT scan and MRI scan in Sri Lanka. Nawaloka Hospital won the first Sri Lanka quality award in 1998.

Services

Nawaloka Medical Centres 
Nawaloka controls 10 medical centre network island wide. Nawaloka launch SARS-CoV-2 PCR testing after approved Sri Lankan Government.

Nawaloka Pharmacy 
Nawaloka a division of Nawaloka Pharmacy PLC, is a branded pharmacy network in Sri Lanka.

Awards 

 Public Service Star Award of Singapore
 ISO 9001:2015
 5 Crown Award for Food Hygiene
 National Business Excellence Award

See also
 List of companies listed on the Colombo Stock Exchange

References

External links 
 Nawaloka Hospital Colombo
 Nawaloka Hospital Negombo

Hospital buildings completed in 1985
Hospitals established in 1978
Private hospitals in Sri Lanka
1985 establishments in Sri Lanka
Hospitals in Colombo
Companies listed on the Colombo Stock Exchange